

Administrative and municipal divisions

References

 
Chuvashia

it:Ciuvascia#Suddivisioni